The 1st Maintenance Battalion is a battalion of the United States Marine Corps that provides intermediate-level maintenance for the  I Marine Expeditionary Force's tactical ordnance, engineer, motor transport, communications electronics and general support ground equipment. The Marines and Sailors of 1st Maintenance Battalion are regularly assigned and deployed around the world with command elements that deliver tactical logistics support to I MEF units. The command is based out of Camp Las Pulgas, Marine Corps Base Camp Pendleton, California and is organized under the command of the 1st Marine Logistics Group.

Subordinate units
 Headquarters and Service Company (HSC)
 General Support Maintenance(GSM)
 Engineer Maintenance Company (EMC)
 Ordnance Maintenance Company (OMC)
 Motor Transportation Maintenance Company (MTMC)
 Electronics Maintenance Company (ELMACO)
 Combat Logistics Company 16 (CLC-16)

Mission
Provide intermediate level maintenance support, to include wheeled and tracked vehicle recovery, salvage and disposal, and general maintenance support, for I MEF's ground equipment in order to improve and sustain MAGTF's combat power. Provide Secondary Reparable Management, including inventory management, storage, financial accounting, and maintenance for secondary and low-density repairables.

History

Organization
Maintenance Company, 1st Combat Service Group was commissioned on October 1, 1947 at Marine Corps Logistics Base Barstow, California.  The battalion relocated to MCB Camp Pendleton, California during October 1947.

Korean War - 1964
Deployed During August 1950 To Kobe, Japan
Redeployed During September 1950 To Inchon, Korea
Participated in the Korean War, Operating From Inchon-Seoul, Chosin Reservoir, East Central Front, And Western Front
Deactivated 19 April 1953
Reactivated 2 July 1953 at Camp Pendleton, California as Motor Transport Support Battalion, 1st Combat Service Group, Service Command, Fleet Marine Force
Redesignated 15 October 1954 As Maintenance Company, 1st Combat Service Group, Service Command, Fleet Marine Force
Redesignated 30 December 1955 As Maintenance Company, 1st Combat Service Group, Fleet Marine Force
Redesignated 1 April 1956 As Maintenance Battalion, 1st Combat Service Group, Fleet Marine Force
Redesignated 1 March 1957 As Material Supply and Maintenance Battalion, 1st Force Service Regiment, Fleet Marine Force
Redesignated 1 September 1964 As Maintenance Battalion, 1st Force Service Regiment, Fleet Marine Force

Vietnam War through 2002
Redesignated 15 February 1967 As Maintenance Battalion, 1st Force Service Regiment, Force Logistic Command, Fleet Marine Force
Participated in The War in Vietnam, February 1967 - April 1971, Operating from Da Nang
Redesignated 23 April 1971 As Maintenance Battalion, 1st Force Service Regiment, Fleet Marine Force and Relocated to Camp Pendleton, California
Redesignated 30 March 1976 As 1st Maintenance Battalion, 1st Force Service Support Group, Fleet Marine Force
Participated in Operations Desert Shield and Desert Storm, Southwest Asia, 1990-1991
Participated in Operation Restore Hope, Somalia, December 1992-March 1993
Numerous Elements Participated in Support of Contingency Operations from 1993-2002

Iraq, Afghanistan, and current operations
Deployed to Kuwait in January 2003 in build-up and support of Operation Iraqi Freedom
Participated in Operation Iraqi Freedom, Iraq, March–July 2003
Participated in Operation Iraqi Freedom, Iraq, February 2004-September 2004  
Participated in Operation Iraqi Freedom, Iraq, October 2008-March 2009
Participated in Operation Enduring Freedom, Afghanistan, April–August 2012

On 26 September 2014, 1st Maintenance Battalion was selected as the winner of the Secretary of Defense Field-level Maintenance Award in the large category.  The awards was presented to the winners on November 18, 2014, in the Sheraton Birmingham Hotel, Birmingham, Alabama, during the awards ceremony that is part of the 2014 DoD Maintenance Symposium.

In 2020 the battalions higher headquarters, Combat Logistics Regiment 15, was disbanded as part of a larger reorganization of the Marine Corps. The battalion now falls directly under the 1st Marine Logistics Group.

See also

History of the United States Marine Corps
List of United States Marine Corps battalions

Citations

References

External links
 1st Maintenance Battalion's official website 

Maint1